The 15th Landwehr Division (15. Landwehr-Division) was a unit of the Prussian Army, part of Imperial German Army in World War I.

The 15th Landwehr Division was stranded in Mykolayiv until March 1919, and evacuated under pressure from Hryhoriev's partisans.

References

 15.Landwehr-Division (Chronik 1915/1918) - Der erste Weltkrieg
 Hermann Cron et al., Ruhmeshalle unserer alten Armee (Berlin, 1935)
 Hermann Cron, Geschichte des deutschen Heeres im Weltkriege 1914-1918 (Berlin, 1937)
 Günter Wegner, Stellenbesetzung der deutschen Heere 1825-1939. (Biblio Verlag, Osnabrück, 1993), Bd. 1
 Histories of Two Hundred and Fifty-One Divisions of the German Army which Participated in the War (1914-1918), compiled from records of Intelligence section of the General Staff, American Expeditionary Forces, at General Headquarters, Chaumont, France 1919 (1920)

Infantry divisions of Germany in World War I